La Gineta is a municipality in Albacete, Castile-La Mancha, Spain. It has a population of 2,072. The historic Church of San Martín stands in the town.

Industry 
La Gineta is the site of a test track of the Talgo RD railway gauge changer.

References

Municipalities of the Province of Albacete